Clinton J. Ford (March 29, 1882 – November 16, 1964) was a Canadian lawyer and judge. He was the Chief Justice of Alberta from 1957 to 1961.

Ford graduated from the University of Toronto in 1907, then studied law at Osgoode Hall. He was admitted to the Alberta Bar in 1910 and practiced in Calgary. He was appointed to the District Court in 1942, to the Trial Division of the Supreme Court of Alberta in 1945, and in 1950 to the Appellate Division. In 1957, he became Chief Justice of Alberta, and retired in 1961.

References 

Judges in Alberta
Canadian lawyers
1882 births
1964 deaths